The Bellingham Review is an American literary magazine published by Western Washington University. The magazine was established in 1977 by the poets Knute Skinner and Peter Nicoletta. The Bellingham Review includes fiction, poetry, and creative non-fiction. The current editor is writer Jane Wong. Work that has appeared in the Bellingham Review has been reprinted in The Pushcart Prize Anthology and The Best American Poetry. Notable contributors include: Micah Nathan, Jenna Blum, Anne Panning, Sheila Bender, and Deborah A. Miranda.

Awards
The magazine yearly awards "The Annie Dillard Award for Creative Nonfiction" and "The Tobias Wolff Award for Fiction". The awards were established by novelist Robin Hemley, a former Bellingham Review editor.

Recent Winners (Nonfiction):
2015 - Leigh Claire Schmidli
2010 - Angela Tung
2009 - Alexandria Marzano-Lesnevich
2008 - Lauren Smith Traore
2007 - Megan Kruse
2006 - Madeline Sonik
2005 - Amy Alznauer
2004 - Bonnie Rough
2003 - Jill Sisson Quinn
2002 - Ander Monson
2001 - Jocelyn Bartkevicius

Recent Winners (Fiction):
2015 - Eric Roe
2010 - Jacob M. Appel
2009 - Irene Keliher
2008 - Edward O’Connell
2007 - Natalie Diaz
2006 - Mark Wisniewski
2005 - Vicky Mlyniec
2004 - Bernadette Smyth
2003 - Natalie Serber
2002 - Morgan McDermott
2001 - John Tait

See also
List of literary magazines

References

External links
 

1977 establishments in Washington (state)
Biannual magazines published in the United States
Literary magazines published in the United States
Magazines established in 1977
Magazines published in Washington (state)
Western Washington University